Iceland, officially Iceland Foods Ltd,  is a British supermarket chain headquartered in Deeside, Wales. It mainly sells frozen foods, including prepared meals and vegetables, alongside non-frozen grocery items such as produce, meat, dairy and dry goods. The company also operates a chain of shops called The Food Warehouse.

History
Iceland Foods began business in 1970, when Malcolm Walker opened the first store in Leg Street, Oswestry, Shropshire, England, with his business partner Peter Hinchcliffe. Together, they invested £60 for one month's rent at the store. They were still employees of Woolworths at the time, and their employment was terminated once their employer discovered their other roles. Iceland Foods initially specialised in loose frozen food. In 1977, they opened a store in Manchester selling own-labelled packaged food, and by 1978 the company had 28 stores.

In 1983, the business grew by purchasing the 18 stores of Bristol-based St. Catherine's Freezer Centres, and in 1984 the business went public for the first time. The cash investment was used to purchase South East-based Orchard Frozen Foods in 1986, and the purchase of larger rival Bejam in 1988. In 1993, the firm took over the food halls of the Littlewoods department store and also acquired the French Au Gel chain. This last move proved unsuccessful and the stores were dropped within a year.

Around 2000, the company attempted ties with British Home Stores. In May 2000, Iceland Foods merged with Booker plc, and Booker's Stuart Rose took the role of CEO of the merged company. He left for the Arcadia Group in November 2000 and was replaced by Bill Grimsey in January 2001.

 Soon after Grimsey's appointment, Malcolm Walker, Iceland Foods's founder and chairman, was forced to stand down, as it was revealed that he had sold £13.5 million of Iceland Foods shares just five weeks before the company released the first of several profits warnings.

Iceland Foods' holding company was renamed the Big Food Group in February 2002, and attempted a refocus on the convenience sector with a bid for Londis. Grimsey remained until the takeover and demerger of the Big Food Group by a consortium led by the Icelandic company Baugur Group in February 2005. Walker subsequently returned to his previous role at Iceland Foods. Iceland Foods's website has a page critical of Grimsey's period in control.

After Baugur collapsed in 2009, a 77% stake in the firm came into the ownership of the Icelandic banks Landsbanki and Glitnir. In 2012 the stake was purchased by a consortium including Malcolm Walker and Graham Kirkham.

After Walker's return to the company, Iceland Foods reduced the workforce at the Deeside head office by 500, with approximately 300 jobs moved as a result of relocation of a distribution warehouse to Warrington.
In January 2009, Iceland Foods announced that it would buy 51 stores in the UK from the failed Woolworths Group chain, three days after the final 200 Woolworths stores closed their doors. In April 2009, Iceland Foods announced plans to close its appliance showrooms by September 2009 to concentrate on food retailing. Iceland Foods's sales for the year ended 27 March 2009 were £2.08 billion, a 16% increase on the previous year, with net profits of £113.7 million. An additional Iceland Foods store opened in Dudley town centre on 2 December 2010 in part of the former Beatties department store, 21 years after their initial departure from the town.

In 2013, two labs, one in Ireland and another in Germany, on behalf of the Irish state agency FSAI, identified 0.1% equine DNA in some Iceland Foods products. Malcolm Walker caused controversy when on a BBC Panorama programme (18 February 2013) he was asked why the products had passed British tests but failed the Irish ones. He replied, "Well, that's the Irish, isn't it?".

In November 2013, the firm began selling appliances online again in partnership with DRL Limited. In May 2014, the firm reintroduced online shopping, which had been dropped in 2007.

In January 2018, Iceland Foods announced that it would end the use of plastic for all of its own-brand products by the end of 2023.

In 2019, Iceland Foods opened 45 new stores in the UK (including 31 larger stores under The Food Warehouse fascia) but had also closed eight, increasing the number of UK stores to 942. The company has a strategic alliance with The Range, where Iceland's food offer has been introduced to nine of the home and garden retailer's stores. In 2019 it also expanded its warehousing locations, adding five multi-temperature regional distribution centres at Livingston, Warrington, Deeside, Enfield and Swindon.

Dispute over the trademark "Iceland"

Iceland Foods Ltd has been accused by the government of Iceland of engaging in abusive behaviour by trademarking the name of the country, and of "harass[ing] Icelandic companies and even the Icelandic tourism board" by pursuing legal action against Icelandic companies which use the name of their country in their trading names. In November 2016, the Icelandic government filed a legal challenge at the European Union Intellectual Property Office (EUIPO) to have the company's trademark invalidated "on the basis that the term 'Iceland' is exceptionally broad and ambiguous in definition, often rendering the country's firms unable to describe their products as Icelandic". The Iceland Magazine noted that:
Iceland Foods was founded in 1970, but only acquired the Europe-wide trademark registration of "Iceland" in 2005. According to the Sagas Iceland, the nation was established in 874. It is an insult to common sense to maintain that the supermarket chain has a stronger claim to the trademark than the country.

In April 2019, The EUIPO invalidated the Iceland trademark.

Domestic operations

Iceland
Iceland has over 900 stores in the UK.

Promotions
In 2006, a policy of "round sum pricing" was introduced, with many products priced in multiples of 25p.

2006 also saw a surge in home delivery promotion, which is now one of the main focuses of the company. When a customer spends £25 or more whilst shopping in-store, they have the option of free next-day home delivery, choosing from available timeslots. Customers can also shop online and receive free next-day home delivery when they spend more than £40.

In October 2008, Iceland Foods launched the Bonus Card, a loyalty card and replacement for the original home delivery card. It allows customers to save money onto the card, with the firm putting £1 onto the card each time a customer saves £20, and gives occasional discounts, offers, and entry to competitions—including their main competition, in which each month one Bonus Card holder from every store wins the entire cost of their shop.

The Food Warehouse
In 2014, Iceland launched The Food Warehouse, a brand name used for their superstores.

As of 2021, there are 140 locations of The Food Warehouse.

Swift

In April 2021, Iceland launched Swift, their brand of convenience stores.

International operations

There were 11 outlets in the Czech Republic, operated by ICL Czech until they closed in 2022.
In 1996, Iceland opened its first store in Ireland. There were seven stores in Ireland, six in Dublin and one in Letterkenny. They all closed down in 2005 owing to financial difficulties. In November 2008, Iceland Foods re-entered the Irish market, reopening a store in Ballyfermot in Dublin after agreeing on a franchise deal with an Irish cash and carry company, AIM. In November 2009, a second Dublin store reopened in Finglas. In November 2013, Iceland Foods acquired seven Irish stores which were previously franchised.

Iceland Foods also operates stores in Spain and Portugal (countries with substantial British communities), in conjunction with Spanish-based retailer Overseas. The stores stock Iceland products as well as Waitrose produce. In July 2012, in a joint venture with Jóhannes Jónsson, co-founder of Bónus and former Iceland owners Baugur Group, the firm opened a store in Kópavogur, Iceland, and subsequently in the capital, Reykjavík. Sandpiper CI has six Iceland Foods franchise supermarkets in Jersey and four in Guernsey.

Via franchise agreement with a local food importer and distributor, Iceland Foods operates in Malta. Initially, in 1998, this was for the supply only of Iceland Foods-branded products to supermarkets, but in 2015 the operation opened stores in Birkirkara, followed by  Mosta, Qawra and Marsascala in 2018. The Malta stores differ from those in the UK: there is a greater emphasis on non-frozen items, and stores feature fresh fruit, vegetables and bakery sections.

Advertising
Iceland Foods historically advertised with the slogan "Mums Love It", which was changed to "Are we doing a deal or are we doing a deal?" and "Feel the deal" in the early 2000s. From the mid-2000s ads featuring Kerry Katona saw a return to a slogan more traditionally associated with Iceland Foods – "So that's why mums go to Iceland!" Katona was dropped as the face of Iceland Foods in 2009 after a tabloid newspaper published pictures allegedly showing her taking cocaine. She was succeeded by Coleen Nolan, Ellie Taylor, Stacey Solomon and Jason Donovan, who has also frequently appeared in the company's Christmas advertisement campaigns. Peter Andre is the current face of the firm. The current main tagline is the truncated "That's why mums go to Iceland". Storefronts also bear the tagline "food you can trust", and carrier bags in stores bear the tagline "the frozen food experts". Since May 2015, the TV adverts have used the tagline and hashtag of "Power Of Frozen" and are fronted and voiced over by Peter Andre.

When the chain bought rival Bejam in 1989, they launched the TV-advertising campaign "Use Our Imagination," which included a song. The campaign was launched so quickly after the takeover that they had no time to convert all Bejam stores to the "Iceland" fascia. Therefore, the song for the commercial featured the line "We're at Bejam's too..."

In 2013, Iceland Foods stores appeared in a BBC documentary called Iceland Foods: Life in The Freezer Cabinet. The firm was the main sponsor of the ITV reality TV show I'm a Celebrity...Get Me Out of Here! from its sixth series in 2006 until its fourteenth series in 2014.

In 2018, Iceland announced they would end the use of palm oil in all their own brand products due to concern over environmental impact of palm oil. It was the first major UK supermarket to ban palm oil.

In January 2020/2021, Iceland Foods stores appeared in two Channel 5 series called Inside Iceland: Britain’s Budget Supermarket.

2018 Rang-tan advert controversy and ban

In November 2018, Iceland Foods submitted a version of an animated short starring a fictional orangutan named Rang-tan (originally released by Greenpeace) to Clearcast, but the submission was denied. Iceland Foods originally planned to utilise the short as the television advertisement that Christmas season, as an extension of their earlier palm oil reduction campaign.

References

External links

 Iceland (UK)
 Iceland (Ireland)

British companies established in 1970
Privately held companies of the United Kingdom
Retail companies established in 1970
Retail companies of the United Kingdom
Supermarkets of Spain
Supermarkets of Portugal
Supermarkets of the Czech Republic
Supermarkets of the Republic of Ireland
Supermarkets of the United Kingdom
Welsh brands
1970 establishments in Wales